The 1940 German Ice Hockey Championship was the 24th season of the German Ice Hockey Championship, the national championship of Germany. 10 teams participated in the championship, and Wiener EG won the title.

First round

Group A

Group B

Final round

References

External links
German ice hockey standings 1933-1945

Ger
German Ice Hockey Championship seasons
Champion